Jubrile Izuhunwa Belo-Osagie (born 27 June 1998) is a British college basketball player for the Montana State Bobcats of the Big Sky Conference (BSC). He previously played for the Lamar CC Runnin' Lopes.

Early life and high school career
Belo grew up in London, England. In 2015, friends convinced him to try basketball. He attended Havering College for two years before opting for a prep year at Barking Abbey School. Belo averaged 8.6 points, nine rebounds, 1.1 steals and one block per game, helping Barking Abbey claim the 2017 EABL National Championship. He committed to playing college basketball at Lamar Community College in June 2017.

College career
Belo redshirted his freshman season at Lamar after breaking his left tibia seven games into the season. As a redshirt freshman, he averaged 15 points, 8.8 rebounds, and 2.1 blocks per game, despite not being fully healthy. He committed to transfer to Montana State in November 2018. Belo averaged 13.1 points and 6.4 rebounds per game as a sophomore, shooting 61.2 percent from the floor. He was named to the Third Team All-Big Sky as well as Big Sky Newcomer of the Year. Belo was forced to quarantine shortly before his junior season due to COVID-19 protocols. On 6 March 2021, he scored a career-high 32 points in a 74–73 loss to Sacramento State. As a junior, Belo averaged 14 points and 5.9 rebounds per game. As a senior, Belo was named Big Sky Player of the Year, Big Sky Defensive Player of the Year and was unanimously selected to the First Team All-Big Sky.

National team career
Belo represented Great Britain at the 2017 FIBA U20 European Championship Division B. He averaged 1.7 points and 2.1 rebounds per game.

Career statistics

College

NCAA Division I

|-
| style="text-align:left;"| 2019–20
| style="text-align:left;"| Montana State
| 31 || 31 || 26.2 || .612 || – || .750 || 6.4 || .7 || .5 || 1.2 || 13.1
|-
| style="text-align:left;"| 2020–21
| style="text-align:left;"| Montana State
| 23 || 23 || 25.3 || .618 || .000 || .748 || 5.9 || 1.0 || .5 || 1.3 || 14.0
|-
| style="text-align:left;"| 2021–22
| style="text-align:left;"| Montana State
| 34 || 33 || 26.9 || .579 || .500 || .716 || 6.7 || 1.1 || .5 || 1.8 || 12.8
|- class="sortbottom"
| style="text-align:center;" colspan="2"| Career
| 88 || 87 || 26.2 || .601 || .333 || .736 || 6.4 || .9 || .5 || 1.4 || 13.2

JUCO

|-
| style="text-align:left;"| 2017–18
| style="text-align:left;"| Lamar CC
| 7 || 4 || 14.1 || .556 || .000 || .765 || 2.4 || .6 || .4 || .4 || 4.7
|-
| style="text-align:left;"| 2018–19
| style="text-align:left;"| Lamar CC
| 30 || 30 || 30.1 || .617 || .000 || .740 || 8.8 || 1.3 || .2 || 2.1 || 15.0
|- class="sortbottom"
| style="text-align:center;" colspan="2"| Career
| 37 || 34 || 27.1 || .613 || .000 || .742 || 7.6 || 1.1 || .2 || 1.8 || 13.1

References

External links
Montana State Bobcats bio
Lamar CC Runnin' Lopes bio

1998 births
Living people
Basketball players from Greater London
Black British sportspeople
British expatriate basketball people in the United States
British men's basketball players
Junior college men's basketball players in the United States
Lamar Community College alumni
Montana State Bobcats men's basketball players
Power forwards (basketball)